Coleophora teheranella is a moth of the family Coleophoridae. It is found in southern Russia, Iran and Oman.

References

teheranella
Moths of Asia
Invertebrates of the Arabian Peninsula
Moths described in 1994